Chapel-en-le-Frith railway station (formerly Chapel-en-le-Frith South) serves the Peak District town of Chapel-en-le-Frith, Derbyshire, England. It was built in 1863 for the London & North Western Railway, on its line from Whaley Bridge to Buxton as an extension of the Stockport, Disley and Whaley Bridge Railway.

In 1867, the Midland Railway built a station (known as Chapel-en-le-Frith Central) on the Sheffield and Midland Railway Companies' Committee line from Millers Dale to Chinley. The town therefore had a main line connection from Manchester to London featuring expresses such as the 'Palatine' and the 'Peaks'. However, with the closure of the ex Midland route from Chinley to Rowsley to passenger traffic in 1967, Central station was closed. The Midland line is still in-situ and used for freight to and from Peak Forest.

The station is one of very few to retain its walkway to cross between platforms; most stations having had footbridges installed. The prime reason for this is the requirement to provide a vehicular crossing for those houses further up the hill which have no reliable alternative, as the very rough alternative is blocked for days during snow, and even when open requires a considerable extra distance to be covered to reach the town centre. A footbridge would therefore not be used.

The former station master's house was used as a restaurant called "Brief Encounter" but has been refurbished and is being used as a band room for Chapel-en-le-Frith Town Band.

Facilities
The station is unstaffed but has a ticket machine which also allows the collection of pre-booked tickets. There are waiting shelters on both platforms and train running information is provided by automated announcements, CIS displays, timetable poster boards and a customer help point on platform 1. Step-free access is available to both sides via the foot crossing at the Whaley Bridge end of the station.

Service
There is generally a half hourly service each day to Manchester Piccadilly northbound all week. All southbound services terminate at Buxton. On Sundays, the service is hourly.

1957 collision

The station was the site of a fatal collision in 1957 which is commemorated with a plaque at the station.

See also
Listed buildings in Chapel-en-le-Frith

References
 Radford, B., (1988) Midland Though The Peak Unicorn Books

External links

Railway stations in Derbyshire
DfT Category F2 stations
Former London and North Western Railway stations
Railway stations in Great Britain opened in 1863
Northern franchise railway stations
Chapel-en-le-Frith